Jacob Jan Vis (30 October 1933, in Wormerveer – 24 January 2011)  was a former Dutch journalist, legal scholar, and politician.

References

Mr. J.J. (Jan) Vis at www.parlement.com

1933 births
2011 deaths
Democrats 66 politicians
Dutch journalists
Dutch legal scholars
Erasmus University Rotterdam alumni
Members of the Senate (Netherlands)
People from Zaanstad
University of Amsterdam alumni
Academic staff of the University of Groningen